This is the electoral history of Gary Peters. Peters is a member of the Democratic Party and was elected to the United States Senate in November 2014 after serving three terms in the United States House of Representatives.  He is a former member of the Michigan Senate, a former Michigan Lottery Commissioner and was the Democratic Nominee for Michigan Attorney General in 2002.

References

Electoral history of politicians from Michigan